Lauren Anne Miller Rogen (née Miller; born July 24, 1981) is an American actress, comedian, screenwriter, and director. She has appeared in the films Superbad (2007), Zack and Miri Make a Porno (2008), and 50/50 (2011).

In 2012, she starred in the film For a Good Time, Call..., which she also co-wrote and produced, and in 2018 made her directorial debut with Like Father.

Early life
Miller was born in Long Island, NY and raised in Lakeland, Florida. She is the daughter of Adele and Scott Miller, and has a brother, Danny. Miller is Jewish. Miller attended the Lois Cowles Harrison Center for the Visual and Performing Arts for High School.

In 2003, Miller graduated from the Florida State University College of Motion Picture Arts. It was there that she met Katie Anne Naylon, the college roommate with whom Miller would later co-write For a Good Time, Call..., based on their personal experiences.

Career
At the beginning of her career, Miller performed supporting roles in several of Seth Rogen's films, including Superbad, Zack and Miri Make a Porno, Observe and Report, and 50/50.

Her first leading film role was opposite Ari Graynor in the comedy that Miller co-wrote and produced, For a Good Time, Call.... Rolling Stone quipped, "In a rare instance of truth in advertising, the movie actually is a good time." Focus Features picked up the rights to the film at the 2012 Sundance Film Festival for about $2 million and released it in the United States on August 31, 2012. Miller was also in two episodes of FOX comedy Ben and Kate.

Personal life
Miller began dating actor Seth Rogen in 2004. They were engaged on September 29, 2010, and married on October 2, 2011. 

In 2012, Miller and Rogen founded the non-profit organization Hilarity for Charity to raise awareness and fund research towards Alzheimer's disease. The disease runs in her family, including her mother who was diagnosed at the age of 55.

Filmography

Film

Television

References

External links

1982 births
American film actresses
American television actresses
Jewish American actresses
Living people
People from Lakeland, Florida
21st-century American actresses
Actresses from Florida
Florida State University alumni
American women screenwriters
American women film producers
American women film directors
Screenwriters from Florida
Film producers from Florida
21st-century American Jews